Homona baolocana is a species of moth of the family Tortricidae. It is found in Vietnam.

The wingspan is about 17 mm. The forewings are brownish, tinged with ferruginous grey. There are rust suffusions at the base of the wing. The hindwings are brownish.

Etymology
The species name refers to the type locality, Bảo Lộc.

References

Moths described in 2008
Homona (moth)